Solskjel or Solskjelsøya is an island in Aure Municipality in Møre og Romsdal county, Norway.  The  island sits just north of the island of Stabblandet, northeast of the larger island of Tustna and west of the island of Ertvågsøya.

The cable ferry began operating on 16 January 2009.

See also
 List of islands of Norway

References

External links
http://www.solskjel.no/ 

Aure, Norway
Islands of Møre og Romsdal